The Remington Model 522 Viper is a semi-automatic rifle chambered for the .22 Long Rifle cartridge.  The Viper uses mostly polymer in construction; only the barrel, bolt and a few small parts are steel.

Features
The stock is made of Rynite.  Barrel length is 20 inches and weight is 4.5 pounds.  The rifle has an integral scope mount rail.  The polymer receiver is permanently attached to the barrel and the sights are attached to the barrel by machine screws.  Magazine capacity is 10 rounds.  Remington briefly produced 25 round magazines for the Viper, but the rifle's introduction was only months before the 1994 Federal Assault Weapons Ban, and the model 522 was dropped before the ban sunset in 2004.  The stock did not include provision for sling mounts; these had to be added by the owner or a gunsmith.

The rifle features both a magazine disconnect safety and a manual safety, as well as a last-round hold-open.

Official capacity is 11 rounds ("includes 1 in chamber"). This requires chambering a round through the port and then inserting the magazine loaded with 10 rounds.

History
The Viper replaced the Remington Nylon 66.  Early reviews were generally positive, but enough people had problems that the Viper never really took off.  Early production Vipers had a hefty steel magazine typically described as "bulletproof". Later production Vipers came with plastic magazines that were often problematic.

The Viper was succeeded by the Remington 597.  Due to its short production history and mediocre acceptance by gun owners, a Viper accessory market never materialized.

Notes

References 
Marcot, Roy M. (2005). "The History of Remington Firearms", Lyons Press.
Viper Owner's Documents (1993).

.22 LR semi-automatic rifles